Lyman Dan White Jr. (born January 3, 1959) is a former American football linebacker. White was drafted in the second round by the Atlanta Falcons out of Louisiana State University in the 1981 NFL Draft.

References

External links
NFL.com player page
Stats

1959 births
Living people
Sportspeople from Lafayette, Louisiana
Players of American football from Louisiana
American football linebackers
LSU Tigers football players
Atlanta Falcons players